Suvorov Memorial Museum (Russian: Музей Суворова) in Saint Petersburg, Russia is a military museum dedicated to the memory of Generalissimo Alexander Suvorov (1729–1800). It was founded in 1900 to commemorate the century of Suvorov's death and was inaugurated four years later, on the 175th anniversary of Suvorov's birth, with much pageantry, in the presence of Emperor Nicholas II.

In 1904, the museum moved into the present building, purpose-built to a flamboyant design by Alexander von Hohen in a dramatic Russian Revival style. The building's austere appearance derives primarily from medieval Muscovite military architecture. Apart from the Suvorov family coat of arms and signs of military glory, the facade displays two mosaics representing "Suvorov Leaving Russia for Italy in 1799" and "Suvorov Crossing the Alps".

The museum's collections, exceeding 100,000 items in 2002, were acquired through purchase and private donations. The Communist authorities had the museum closed down in 1919 and the collections were dispersed to other museums. In the 1930s, the building housed the AeroMuseum. During the Siege of Leningrad, it was damaged by a bomb.

During World War II the respect of Suvorov was restored in the Soviet military. As a consequence, the museum building was renovated in 1950 and resumed its activity the following year. The latest restoration was undertaken in 1995-2000.

See also
Suvorov Museum, Timanivka, Timanivka, Tulchyn, Vinnitsya, Ukraine
Suvorov Museum, Ochakiv, Ochakiv, Ukraine
Suvorov Museum and Reserve, in Konchanskoye-Suvorovckoye, Russia
Suworow Museum, Linthal, Linthal, Switzerland 
Suvorov Museum, Izmail, Izmail, Ukraine
Suvorov Military History Museum, Kobrin, Kobrin, Belarus
List of museums in Saint Petersburg

Further reading 
 Музей А. В. Суворова: Путеводитель. Л., 1954;
 Охотников И. В. Музей А. В. Суворова. Л., 1969;
 Меерович Г. И. Музей А. В. Суворова: Историко-краеведческий очерк. Л., 1981.

External links 

 
 Views of the museum
 Suvorov Memorial Museum

Military and war museums in Saint Petersburg
Biographical museums in Saint Petersburg
Museums established in 1900
Cultural infrastructure completed in 1904
1900 establishments in the Russian Empire
Alexander Suvorov
Cultural heritage monuments of federal significance in Saint Petersburg